Leone Sinigaglia  (14 August 1868 – 16 May 1944) was an Italian composer and mountaineer.

Biography 
Born in Turin into an upper-middle-class Jewish family, Sinigaglia studied music at the conservatory of music in Turin with Giovanni Bolzoni.  Sinigaglia knew the leading figures of thought, arts and science that lived in the city at the time, such as Galileo Ferraris, Cesare Lombroso, and Leonardo Bistolfi. A lover of literature and mountaineering from an early age, the young Sinigaglia spent many holidays in or near Cavoretto, just outside the city, a place that would provide him with much inspiration. Among the works composed in these Turinese years are the  Romanza  opus 3 for horn and string quartet. (This has been recorded in an arrangement for horn and string orchestra.)

In 1888 Sinigaglia began to travel: after spells in several European cities, from 1894 he lived in Vienna, where he associated with Johannes Brahms from whom he developed a taste for so-called absolute music, studying with Eusebius Mandyczewski. In these years he wrote several Lieder and the Concerto for violin and orchestra, opus 20.

From 1900 he worked in Prague with Antonín Dvořák (whom he possibly met through his friendship with the Bohemian Quartet in Vienna). From Dvořák he learned the ability to apply classical techniques to the arrangement of popular songs.

His productivity diminished progressively in the following decades. Nazi police occupied Turin in 1944 and he was to be sent to Germany as slave laborer but suffered a fatal heart attack at the moment of his arrest.

Musical works 
In the ten years that followed his return to Turin in 1901, Sinigaglia transcribed an enormous amount of popular song from the oral tradition, largely collected on the hills of Cavoretto. Many of these were arranged for singer and pianoforte in a style that is reminiscent of the German songs of the late 19th century: they include a set of twelve Old popular songs of Piedmont  (published initially in Leipzig by Breitkopf & Härtel, 1914; a third and fourth edition were published in 1921, and a fifth and sixth in 1927). As well as this collection, for which Sinigaglia's name is still remembered today, his other compositions of the same period show a deep love for the musical spirit of his native region, as for example in the two  Piedmontese Dances  opus 31 (1905) and the  Suite for orchestra "Piemonte"  (1909). Both of these are closely identified with the name of Arturo Toscanini, who performed them frequently.

It was not only ethnically-inspired works that resulted from these happy years: the overture to  The Chiozzotte Quarrels  (1907), as well as the Piedmontese works, were directed by conductors of the calibre of Wilhelm Furtwängler and John Barbirolli. Toscanini included the music in broadcast concerts by the NBC Symphony Orchestra. Among his chamber works that are still remembered are the two sonatas, opus 41 for cello and pianoforte, and opus 44 for violin and pianoforte.

Mountaineering 
Sinigaglia was a keen mountain climber in his youth, amassing an impressive catalogue of ascents in the Dolomites. He has been described as "the first great Italian climber in the Dolomites". Two of his most famous climbs were first ascents on Croda da Lago and Monte Cristallo. His book, Climbing reminiscences of the Dolomites, was published in English in 1898, shortly after the Italian edition, and is still regarded as a classic of climbing literature.

Other compositions

Chamber works
Romanza for horn and string quartet, opus 3 (1889?).
Konzert-Etude (Concert-Study) for string quartet, opus 5.
Drei romantische Stücke für Violine mit Clavierbegleitung (Three Romantic pieces for violin with piano accompaniment), opus 13. published in 1902 by the Danish publisher Wilhelm Hansen.
Twelve variations on a theme by Franz Schubert, for oboe and piano, opus 19
String quartet in D major, opus 27. Published by Breitkopf & Härtel in 1906.
Piece for horn and piano, opus 28 (recorded by Frøydis Ree Wekre, horn and Zita Carno, piano on a Crystal Records LP, transferred to CD.)
Serenade for string trio in D, opus 33 (published by Breitkopf in 1908)
Hora Mystica for string quartet; published by Richault et C. in Paris

String orchestra (or with string orchestra)
Adagio tragico, opus 21 (recorded by Jiri Starek and the RIAS Sinfonietta on Koch Schwann)

Orchestra
Lamento in memoria di un giovane artista (Natale Canti), opus 38. Published by Breitkopf & Härtel in 1930.
Ouvertüre zu Goldonis Lustspiel Le Baruffe Chiozzotte, opus 32. Published by Breitkopf & Härtel in 1908.
Piemonte: suite per orchestra sopra temi popolari, opus 36 (published in reduced form by Breitkopf, 1912). In 4 sections.

Bibliography
Sinigaglia, Leone.  Climbing reminiscences of the Dolomites. With introduction by Edmund J. Garwood. Tr. by Mary Alice Vialls]. London: T. F. Unwin, 1896. xxiii, 224 p. 39 plates (incl. front.) fold. map. 25 cm.
Sinigaglia, Leone. 36 Vechhie canzoni popolari del Piemonte, annotated reprint of the Breitkopf & Härtel edition, ed. by L.Benone Giacoletto and A.Lanza, Torino: G.Zedde, 2002
Sinigaglia, Leone. La raccolta inedita di 104 canzoni popolari piemontesi, ed. by Andrea Lanza, Torino: G.Zedde, 2004
" Gianluca La Villa-Annalisa Lo Piccolo. "Leone Sinigaglia, la musica delle alte vette" ed. by Gabrielli editori, Verona, 2012

Documents 
Letters by Leone Sinigaglia held by the State Archives in Leipzig, company archives of the Music Publishing House C.F.Peters (Leipzig).

References

External links
Leone Sinigaglia Serenade for String Trio Op.33 sound-bites and short discussion

1868 births
1944 deaths
Sportspeople from Turin
20th-century Italian Jews
Italian classical composers
Italian male classical composers
Italian mountain climbers
Jewish classical composers
Italian Romantic composers
20th-century Italian male musicians
19th-century Italian male musicians
19th-century Italian Jews
Musicians from Turin
Italian Jews who died in the Holocaust